Le Centre-de-la-Mauricie was a former regional county municipality and census division in the Mauricie region of Quebec, Canada. Prior to its dissolution, it consisted of:

Villes
 Grand-Mère
 Shawinigan
 Shawinigan-Sud

Municipalities
 Charette
 Lac-à-la-Tortue

Parish Municipalities
 Notre-Dame-du-Mont-Carmel
 Saint-Élie
 Saint-Gérard-des-Laurentides
 Saint-Jean-des-Piles
 Saint-Mathieu-du-Parc

Villages
 Saint-Boniface-de-Shawinigan
 Saint-Georges-de-Champlain

The RCM was dissolved on December 31, 2001, when the municipalities of Charette, Saint-Boniface-de-Shawinigan, Saint-Élie, and Saint-Mathieu-du-Parc were transferred to the Maskinongé Regional County Municipality, Notre-Dame-du-Mont-Carmel was transferred to the Les Chenaux Regional County Municipality, and the remaining municipalities were amalgamated into the new City of Shawinigan.

See also 
 Municipal history of Quebec

References 

Former regional county municipalities in Quebec
Populated places disestablished in 2001